Bakkal may refer to:

People
 Mesut Bakkal, Turkish football manager
 Otman Bakkal, Dutch footballer of Moroccan origin

Places
 Baqqal, or Bakkal, village and municipality in the Shaki Rayon of Azerbaijan

Arabic-language surnames
Turkish-language surnames